Malachi 1 is the first chapter of the Book of Malachi in the Hebrew Bible or the Old Testament of the Christian Bible. This book contains the prophecies attributed to the prophet Malachi, and is a part of the Book of the Twelve Minor Prophets.

Text
The original text was written in Hebrew language. This chapter is divided into 14 verses.

Textual witnesses
Some early manuscripts containing the text of this chapter in Hebrew are of the Masoretic Text, which includes the Codex Cairensis (895), the Petersburg Codex of the Prophets (916), Aleppo Codex (10th century), Codex Leningradensis (1008).

There is also a translation into Koine Greek known as the Septuagint, made in the last few centuries BCE. Extant ancient manuscripts of the Septuagint version include Codex Vaticanus (B; B; 4th century), Codex Sinaiticus (S; BHK: S; 4th century), Codex Alexandrinus (A; A; 5th century) and Codex Marchalianus (Q; Q; 6th century).

The LORD’s love for Israel (1:1–5)

Verse 1
 The burden of the word of the Lord to Israel by Malachi.
 "By Malachi": literally, "by the hand of Malachi" (cf. Jeremiah 37:2). Malachi is the proper name of the prophet, and not a mere official designation. The Greek Septuagint renders , "by the hand of his angel," or "messenger," leading theories that an angel was the real author of the book, or an angel came and explained it to the people. Haggai is also called "The Lord's Messenger" (Haggai 1:13). Septuagint adds at the end of the verse: "fix it in your hearts," which according Jerome was imported from Haggai 2:15.

Verse 2
 I have loved you, saith the Lord. Yet ye say, Wherein hast thou loved us? Was not Esau Jacob's brother? saith the Lord: yet I loved Jacob,
 "I have loved you": this is said in comparison to other nations, even above the other descendants of Abraham and Isaac; the statement is 'left unexpressed, sorrow as it were breaking off the sentence' (Hosea 11:1).

Verse 3
And I hated Esau, and laid his mountains and his heritage waste for the dragons of the wilderness.
"I hated Esau": Paul quotes these words in Romans 9:13 to illustrate his position, "that the purpose of God according to election might stand, not of works, but of him that calleth." Even before his birth Jacob was the chosen one, and Esau, the elder, was to serve the younger. However, Malachi is not speaking of the predestination of the one brother and the reprobation of the other; he is contrasting the histories of the two peoples represented by them, that both nations sinned; both are punished; but Israel by God's free mercy was forgiven and restored, while Edom was left in the misery for its iniquity, thus proving God's love for the Israelites.
"Laid his mountains": According to Grotius, it was done by Nebuchadnezzar five years after the captivity of the Jews, in fulfillment of the prophecy of Jeremiah (Jeremiah 49:7) or this could be done by the Nabatheans. Mount Seir was the famous mountain that Esau dwelt in (Genesis 36:8) and with other peaks collectively are called "mountains", which waste and desolate state was reported in the past.
"His heritage waste": Malachi attests the first stage of fulfillment of Joel's prophecy (Joel 3:19) that "Edom shall be a desolate wilderness." In temporal things, Esau's blessing was identical with Jacob's; "the fatness of the earth and of the dew of heaven from above;" and the rich soil on the terraces of its mountain-sides, though yielding nothing now except a wild beautiful vegetation, and its deep glens, attest what they once must have been, when artificially watered and cultivated. The first desolation must have been through Nebuchadnezzar, in his expedition against Egypt, when he subdued Moab and Ammon; and Edom lay in his way, as Jeremiah had foretold Jeremiah 25:9 and Jeremiah 25:21. 
"Dragons": rather, "jackals" (Micah 1:8); cf. Isaiah 34:13. Septuagint, εἰς δώματα ἐρήμου, "for habitations of the desert;" Vulgate, dracones deserti, whence the Authorized Version.

The polluted offerings (1:6–14)
The section contains Malachi's rebuke for the dishonoring of God’s name which is addressed to the priests as the responsible persons, but also applies to the whole nation.

Verse 11
For from the rising of the sun to its setting, My name will be great among the nations, and in every place incense will be offered to My name, and a pure offering. For My name will be great among the nations, says the Lord of Hosts.
"Will be": or "is" (three times in verse 11; also verse 14).

See also

Related Bible parts: Genesis 25, Psalm 113, Isaiah 24, Isaiah 45, Isaiah 59, Romans 9, Romans 12

Notes and references

Bibliography

External links

Jewish
Malachi 1 Hebrew with Parallel English
Malachi 1 Hebrew with Rashi's Commentary

Christian
Malachi 1 English Translation with Parallel Latin Vulgate

01